360 degrees may refer to a circle.

360 degrees may also refer to:
 360° (EP), an EP by Infinite
 360 Degrees (album), an LPG album
 "360 Degrees (What Goes Around)", a song on Reel to Reel by Grand Puba
 Anderson Cooper 360°, a television news show

See also
 
 360 (disambiguation)

 360 degree camera
 360-degree feedback
 360 degree view